A Seascape. The Coast of the Island of Rügen in Evening Light (literally "A Seascape: The coast of Rügen seen in evening light after a stormy day") is an 1818 oil on canvas marine painting by J.C. Dahl, measuring 37 cm by 58.5 cm and now in the Danish National Gallery, which purchased it at auction in 1975. It was his first marine painting and the first work he produced in Dresden. A signed compositional drawing for it is now in the Bergen Museum of Art.

The work is based on his eight-day journey from Denmark to Germany. He noted in his diary that a storm had come out of nowhere and not ceased before reaching Rügen, making him seasick throughout the voyage. The work was commissioned by Prince Christian Frederik in 1818 and Dahl was paid for the work in February 1819. After Christian Frederik's death in 1848 it was inherited by his son Frederik, who immediately gave it to Countess Danner. After Frederik's death in 1863 it was sold at auction to a private collector in 1864.

References

External links
SMK website: Et søstykke. Kysterne af Rügen set i aftenrøden efter en stormfuld dag KMS6852 

Maritime paintings
1818 paintings
Paintings by Johan Christian Dahl
Paintings in the collection of the National Gallery of Denmark
19th-century paintings in Denmark